Weronika Deresz (born 5 September 1985) is a Polish rower. She competed in the women's lightweight double sculls event at the 2016 Summer Olympics.

References

External links
 

1985 births
Living people
Polish female rowers
Olympic rowers of Poland
Rowers at the 2016 Summer Olympics
Rowers from Warsaw
World Rowing Championships medalists for Poland
European Rowing Championships medalists